For main article please see Maccabi Haifa Football Club

Managers from 1946 to present.

References

External links
List of managers 

 
Lists of association football managers
Maccabi